Daniel S. Hurley (born January 16, 1973) is an American basketball coach who currently coaches the University of Connecticut men's basketball team. Hurley was named head coach of the Huskies on March 22, 2018, after two years at Wagner College and six years at the University of Rhode Island. Hurley turned down an aggressive long-term offer from Rhode Island in order to lead UConn. Prior to Wagner, Hurley was head coach of Saint Benedict's Preparatory School, where he is credited with building the New Jersey school into one of the top high school basketball programs in America. 

Hurley played five years of college basketball, including a redshirt year, at Seton Hall.  During his first three seasons, his head coach was P. J. Carlesimo.

Hurley is the youngest son of Hall of Fame high school coach Bob Hurley. His brother Bobby Hurley is a former Duke and Sacramento Kings guard and the current head coach at Arizona State University. From 2010 to 2013, Bobby was one of Dan's assistant coaches at both Rhode Island and Wagner.

On September 6, 2019, Hurley had surgery to replace two disks in his neck with artificial ones. Doctors told Hurley the condition was part hereditary and part the result of years of wear and tear associated with being a life-long athlete. Hurley returned to work less than two weeks after surgery.

Head coaching record

References

External links
 Connecticut profile

1973 births
Living people
American men's basketball coaches
American men's basketball players
Basketball coaches from New Jersey
Basketball players from Jersey City, New Jersey
College men's basketball head coaches in the United States
High school basketball coaches in New Jersey
Point guards
Rhode Island Rams men's basketball coaches
Rutgers Scarlet Knights men's basketball coaches
Seton Hall Pirates men's basketball players
Sportspeople from Jersey City, New Jersey
St. Anthony High School (New Jersey) alumni
UConn Huskies men's basketball coaches
Wagner Seahawks men's basketball coaches